Darreh Garm-e Chenar (also Romanized as Darreh Garm-e Chenār; also known as Darreh Garm and Darreh Garm-e Mīān Chenār) is a village in Chenar Rural District, Kabgian District, Dana County, Kohgiluyeh and Boyer-Ahmad Province, Iran. At the 2006 census, its population was 100, in 21 families.

References 

Populated places in Dana County